Brillianty (Russian: Бриллианты, Diamonds) is the first compilation album by Nu Virgos.

Track listing

Release history

External links
 Official Website

Nu Virgos albums
2005 compilation albums